The pygmy forest frog (Platymantis pygmaeus) is a species of frog in the family Ceratobatrachidae.
It is endemic to the Philippines. It occurs in the Central Cordilleras and Sierra Madres of northern Luzon, and possibly also on Sibuyan Island.

Its natural habitats are subtropical or tropical dry forest, subtropical or tropical moist lowland forest, and subtropical or tropical moist montane forest.
It is threatened by habitat loss.

References

Platymantis
Amphibians of the Philippines
Endemic fauna of the Philippines
Taxonomy articles created by Polbot
Amphibians described in 1998